Pantazis is a Greek family name. It is derived from the wish "live forever!".
Notable people with this name include:
 Andreas Pantazis (born 2000), Greek triple jumper
 Konstantinos Pantazis (1915–…), Greek athlete
 Lefteris Pantazis (born 1955), Greek singer
 Périclès Pantazis (1849–1884), Greek impressionist painter

See also
Pantazi

References 

Greek-language surnames
Surnames